John McSweeney, commonly known by his stage name John Zewizz, is a British-born American industrial music performer.  Since the late 1970s, Zewizz has recorded hundreds of cassettes, LPs, vinyl, and CD releases.  He has also worked as a video director, magazine publisher, and record label owner (Inner-X-Musick).

Early life 
John McSweeney was born in Essex, England on August 15, 1955.  His family moved to the United States when McSweeney was an infant.  McSweeney's love and knowledge of music grew through his high school years.  Friends remember him as "the definitive rock and roll Impresario. If John didn't have the record, you didn't need to hear it.", During the 1970s McSweeney was the president of a Rolling Stone fan club called "Smooth".  It was in the late 1970s McSweeney began listening to bands like Throbbing Gristle.  This was a huge influence on his musical direction.

McSweeney began his musical career in the late 1970s performing as "John Cage" in various bands. In 1978, he recorded under the alias "Green Sex". The output was limited and by 1981 "Green Sex" ceased to exist.  During this time John began going by the name John Zewizz (or John Ze'Wizz), and even briefly fronted a band called Ze Wizz Kidz in 1979 with friends Aero Cixal and Robert Catalono.

Career 
John Zewizz is the sole permanent member of the band Sleep Chamber. He has also recorded under the name "Green Sex", "Ze Wizz Kidz", "Hidious in Strength", "Women of the SS", "Noizeclot", "Cult Ov The Womb" as well as recording under his own name "John Zewizz". He has produced recordings by "Sleep Chamber", "Dokument", "The Product", "Daze OF Trance" and "Women of Sodom". Between 1981 and 2000, Zewizz released close to 100 recordings as the driving force behind Sleep Chamber. Sleep Chamber fell silent in 2000 as a result of Zewizz's drug addiction, but in 2007 Sleep Chamber reformed (now known as SLEEPCHAMBER) and began recording again.

During the early to mid-1980s Zewizz published a magazine called "The Other Sound".  The magazine was used primarily as a propaganda vehicle for Inner-X-Musick artists, and music that was for sale in Zewizz 's record shop "Innersleeve Records".   The magazine ran from late 1983 through 1986.  Only 8 issues were made before the zine stopped production.  A 9th issue was to be produced, but Zewizz could not finance the printing.  The material was given to a third party who published them under the magazine name "Issue #9".

Zewizz has released 2 solo recordings during his career. In 1987 he released a solo cassette on Inner-X-Musick titled Passion Ov Pan, and in 2010 on the Old Europa Cafe label he released the CD 2012.

Drug addiction
Zewizz admits that drugs played a large role in his life from the age of 14. During the 1990s he was addicted to heroin and by 2001 his music career had all but stopped because of this addiction. According to himself he was able to get clean in 2004 through use of "magick". Zewizz claims, "I had to use magick to break the bonds that drugs had on me. It waz part ov my being. Drugs became my world and everything in it. Only magick waz strong enough to focus my will and to direct my will into power."

Murder investigation 
In 1996, Zewizz was questioned for the murder of Karina Holmer, a Swedish au pair living in Boston. Karina's body was found in a dumpster not far from Zewizz's home. The police considered John a suspect, but no charges were ever brought. The accusation, coupled with a growing heroin addiction, quickly began to destroy the band and to lead Zewizz away from band mates and friends.

Discography
As John Zewizz

As a member Of Sleep Chamber (See Sleep Chamber)

As Hidious in Strength

As Women of the SS

As Noiseclot''

As Cult Ov Womb

References

External links
 
 The John Zewizz Appreciation Society – official website

1955 births
Living people
American industrial musicians
Musicians from Essex